Bothriolepidoidei is a suborder of antiarch placoderm fishes. The group is considered paraphyletic.

Taxonomy
The cladogram is taken from Bothriolepid antiarchs (Vertebrata, Placodermi) from the Devonian of the north-western part of the East European Platform.

Genera 
Bothriolepis

Bothriolepis is a well-known, widespread genus, known worldwide, except South America. It lived in freshwater, as well as marine environments. It was a benthic detritivore.

Dianolepis

Dianolepis is from the Middle Devonian of China.

Grossilepis

Grossilepis is the sister taxa to the better-known Bothriolepis.

Hohsienolepis

Houershanospis

Jiangxilepis

Microbrachius

Monarolepis

Monarolepis is from the Middle Devonian of Australia,

Tenizolepis

Vietnamaspis

Wudinolepis

Wufengshania

Wufengshania was a bothriolepidid that lived in Yunnan, China, during the Emsian.

References 

Antiarchi